Piagiolino Airfield is an abandoned World War II military airfield in Italy, which was located about 1 km southwest of Monterado (Provincia di Ancona, The Marches); 200 km north of Rome.  It was a temporary all-weather airfield used by the 52d Fighter Group between 21  April and 8 July 1945.

Today, the land on which the airfield existed can be identified by the scarring on the earth evident in aerial photographs.

References

 Maurer, Maurer. Air Force Combat Units of World War II. Maxwell AFB, Alabama: Office of Air Force History, 1983. .

External links

Airfields of the United States Army Air Forces in Italy
Airports established in 1944